Theunis G. van Wyk (born 21 March 1944) is a Zambian former wrestler. He competed in the men's freestyle middleweight at the 1964 Summer Olympics.

References

External links
 

1944 births
Living people
Northern Rhodesia people
Zambian male sport wrestlers
Olympic wrestlers of Northern Rhodesia
Wrestlers at the 1964 Summer Olympics
Place of birth missing (living people)